Philip Wolfe, and similar variations, may refer to:

 Philip Wolfe (mathematician) (1927–2016), American mathematician
 Philip Wolfe (engineer) (born 1950), British renewable energy specialist
 Philip C. Wolf (1956–2021), American entrepreneur and executive
 Philipp Wolf (born 1992), German Olympic swimmer

See also 
Philip A. Wolff House and Carriage House
Philipp Wolfgang, Count of Hanau-Lichtenberg
Philipp Wolfrum